Terellia euura is a species of tephritid or fruit flies in the genus Terellia of the family Tephritidae.

Distribution
Ukraine to Central Asia.

References

Tephritinae
Insects described in 1942
Diptera of Europe
Diptera of Asia